The Dniester Pumped Storage Power Station is a pumped storage hydroelectric scheme that uses the Dniester River  northeast of Sokyriany in Chernivtsi Oblast, Ukraine.

Background
As part of the Dniester Hydro Power Complex, the pumped storage power station (PSP) was planned in the 1970s along with two dams (Dniester I & II) and a nuclear power plant. In 1983, Dniester II, a dam which creates the PSP's lower reservoir, was completed. The PSP was approved by 1988 and construction began that same year. Three years later in 1991 though, construction was suspended due to a funding fallout from the dissolution of the Soviet Union. The project was re-approved in 1993 and construction commenced again in 2001. Project costs increased due to the poor state of the existing facilities which were not maintained while the project was suspended. On December 22, 2009, the PSP's first generator was commissioned. The second generator was commissioned in December 2013. The third generator was commissioned on 21 December 2015. Fourth generator was commissioned in July 2021.

Ukraine's problems funding the project have been compounded by controversy surrounding the project's transparency and impacts on the environment and water flow to Moldova downstream. Ukraine had sought funding from the World Bank who, in 2007, only funded US$29.6 million towards the PSP's electrical transmission system. Industry experts believe Ukraine will be able to complete the project independently. The power station is expected to be fully operational in 2020s.

Design and operation
Water pumped from this reservoir is placed in the upper reservoir which is formed by a 360° "liver"-shaped embankment dam. The upper reservoir has a  storage capacity. During periods of high energy demand, water is released from the upper reservoir back to the power station for generation. This process is routinely repeated and helps balance loads.

While only 4 are currently operational, the power station will contain 7 324 MW reversible Francis turbine generators. Its installed capacity will be 2,268 MW when generating and during pumping, the power station will consume a maximum of 2,947 MW. HPP-II has an installed capacity of 40.8 MW.

See also
 Hydroelectricity in Ukraine

List of power stations in Ukraine
List of pumped-storage power stations

References

Hydroelectric power stations in Ukraine
Pumped-storage hydroelectric power stations in Ukraine
Landmarks in Chernivtsi Oblast
Buildings and structures in Chernivtsi Oblast
State companies of Ukraine
Companies based in Chernivtsi Oblast
Dams on the Dniester